Michael Patterson is an American record producer and mixer. He has worked on the albums Midnite Vultures  (1999) by Beck (where he was nominated for a Grammy award), Life After Death (1997) by Notorious B.I.G., the debut album by Black Rebel Motorcycle Club, B.R.M.C. (2001), and dark pop duo She Wants Revenge's first two albums, She Wants Revenge and This Is Forever.

He also mixed the soundtrack and score to The Social Network and The Girl With The Dragon Tattoo'.

He has remixed such artists as Tricky, Mindless Self Indulgence and Puscifer (under the name Narcovice). Patterson works out of his studio "The Pleasuredome" in Los Angeles, California.

He also produced several songs for the 2007 Duran Duran album, Reportage. They were put aside following Andy Taylor's departure from the band; Duran Duran fansites have called this the "Lost Michael Patterson album".

Patterson produced Spleen United Neanderthal (for which he was nominated for a Danish music critics award for best producer 2008).

Patterson was born in Memphis, Tennessee.

 Partial discography 
2013 - Eric Avery - Life.Time  - Mixing
2013 - Nine Inch Nails - Live 2013 EP - Mixing
2013 - Heavy Glow - Mine All Mine/Headhunter 7 - Producer, Mixing
2013 - Black Rebel Motorcycle Club - Specter at the Feast - Mixing, Production
2014 - Atticus Ross - Love and Mercy - Mixing, Soundtrack
2014 - Heavy Glow - Pearls & Swine and Everything Fine Producer - Mixing
2014 - MØ - No Mythologies to Follow - Mixing
2015 - Saybia - No Sound from the Outside  - Producer
2015 - Avec Sans - Resonate - Mixing
Romy - Upcoming Album - Mixing
2016 - Saul Williams - Martyr Loser King  - Mixing
2015 - Julie Mintz - The Thin Veil  Mixing,
Death Has No Dominion - Death Has No Dominion  Mixing,
The Bots - New Album - Mixing
Home Video - Forget - Mixing,
IO Echo - Ministry of Love -  Mixing,
Gliss - Langsom Danse  Mixing, Additional Production
Rob Simonsen - The Spectacular Now  Music Scoring Mixer
How to Destroy Angels - An Omen EP  Mixing (one song)
Atticus Ross - Broken City  Mixing- Soundtrack
Paint - Songs for Fighter Pilots  Producer,Mixing
Blaqk Audio - Bright Black Heaven  Mixing
Søren Huss - Oppefra og ned  Mixing
Home Video - Upcoming Album  Mixing
My Heart Belongs to Cecelia Winter - Upcoming Album  Mixing
Dear Boy  - Upcoming Album  Mixing
Data Romance - Upcoming Album  Mixing
Trent Reznor and Atticus Ross - The Girl with the Dragon Tattoo soundtrack  Mixing- Score and Soundtrack
Trent Reznor and Atticus Ross - The Social Network soundtrack  Mixing- Score and Soundtrack
Azure Ray - Drawing Down the Moon  Mixing
Snow & Voices - Anything That Moves  Mixing
Sea Wolf - O Maria  Mixing
The Morlocks - The Morlocks Play Chess  Mixing, Producer
Amusement Parks on Fire – Road Eyes	Mixing, Producer
Puscifer – C is for.....	Mixing
Paper Route – Absence	Mixing
Great Northern – Remind Me Where the Light Is 	Mixing, Producer
Malea McGuinness - Mixing, Producer
O+S – O+S 	Mixing, Producer
OPM – Golden State of Mind   	Mixing
Ladytron – Velocifero 	  Mixing
Puscifer – V Is for Viagra: The Remixes   	Mixing, Producing (under the name Narcovice)
The Fashion – Mix Tape for a Funeral  	Mixing
She Wants Revenge – This Is Forever  	 Mixing
B5 – Don't Talk, Just Listen   	Mixing
The Notorious B.I.G. – Greatest Hits  	 Engineer, Mixing
Soul Kid#1 – Americanized 	 Mixing, Producer
David Holmes – David Holmes Presents the Free Association   	Mixing
She Wants Revenge – She Wants Revenge	 Mixing
Sosohuman – Twenty-Six  	Mixing, Producer
Limp Bizkit – Home Sweet Home/Bittersweet Symphony Mixing
Ringside – Ringside  Mixing
Fischerspooner – Odyssey  Mixing
Isidore – Isidore, Sonic Guidance
Sleepwell – Sleepwell, Sonic Guidance
Shifty Shellshock – Happy Love Sick Mixing
The Glitterati – Here Comes a Close Up  Mixing, Producer
Goldy Locks – Sometimes Engineer, Mixing, Producer
Limp Bizkit – Results May Vary  Mixing
Tim Burgess – I Believe  Mixing, Producer
David Holmes – David Holmes Presents the Free Association  Mixing
Jennifer Lopez – I'm Gonna Be Alright / Walking On Sunshine  Mixing
Diddy – I Need a Girl  Engineer, Mixing
Diddy – We Invented the Remix Engineer
Black Rebel Motorcycle Club – B.R.M.C.  Mixing
Custom – Fast  Engineer, Mixing, Producer, Vocals (Background)
The X-ecutioners – Built From Scratch  Mixing
Mr. Cheeks – Lights, Camera, Action! Mixing
Mary J. Blige – No More Drama   Engineer
G. Dep – Child of the Ghetto  Engineer, Mixing
SWV – Best of SWV  Mixing
MC Lyte – Very Best of MC Lyte Mixing
Little-T and One Track Mike – Fome Is Dape  Mixing
Jennifer Lopez – J.Lo  Engineer, Mixing
Diddy – The Saga Continues  Mixing
Geggy Tah – Into the Oh   Mixing
Gary Jules – Trading Snakeoil for Wolftickets  Engineer, Mixing,Mastering
Limp Bizkit – Chocolate Starfish and the Hot Dog Flavored Water  Mixing
Shyne – Shyne  Mixing
OPM – Menace to Sobriety Programming, Engineer, Producer, Mixing
Lil' Kim – The Notorious K.I.M    Engineer, Mixing
Boyz II Men – Evolution    Engineer
Jimmy Barnes – Love and Fear   Mixing
Moby – Why Does My Heart Feel So Bad? FAFU Remix  Associate Producer
The Notorious B.I.G. – Born Again   Engineer, Mixing
Beck – Midnite Vultures   Mixing
Sauce Money – Middle Finger U   Engineer
Black Rob – Life Story   Mixing
Diddy – Forever  Mixing, Engineer
Barry White – Staying Power   Engineer
Lil' Cease – Wonderful World of Cease A Leo  EngineerTracie
Mase – Double Up   Mixing
R. Kelly – R.  Engineer
Total – Kima, Keisha & Pam    Mixing
Faith Evans – Keep the Faith   Mixing
112 – Room 112   Mixing
The LOX – Money, Power & Respect   Engineer, Mixing
Imajin – Shorty (You Keep Playin' with My Mind)    MixingVarious Artists
Jay-Z – In My Lifetime, Vol. 1    Engineer, Mixing
Mase – Harlem World  Engineer, Mixing
LL Cool J – Phenomenon  Engineer, Mixing
Boyz II Men – Evolution  Engineer
SWV – Release Some Tension  Mixing
Diddy – No Way Out  1997 Engineer, Mixing
The Notorious B.I.G. – Life After Death  Engineer, Mixing
TLC – CrazySexyCool  Engineer, Mixing
SWV – Someone   Mixing
112 – 112   Engineer, Mixing
Eternal – Power of a Woman  Engineer, MIDI, Sound Design
Monica – Miss Thang  Engineer, Mixing
A Few Good Men – Take a Dip  Engineer
Larry Springfield – I'm Just a Man   Engineer
Jus' Cauze – Jus' Cauze  Programming, Engineering
Jerry Butler – Time & Faith  Sampling, Digital Editing
Shawn Lane – Powers of Ten  Editing
Bend – Trying to Find Function''  Producer

Controversy
In 2015 alongside his friend and business partner Adam Bravin, Patterson created the goth oriented club Cloak & Dagger in Los Angeles, California. In June 2020 the club was closed amidst allegations of sexual misconduct, sexual harassment and discriminatory treatment against people of color.

References

External links

Living people
Record producers from Tennessee
People from Memphis, Tennessee
Year of birth missing (living people)